Strength Power Will Passion is the ninth studio album by German thrash metal band Holy Moses. It was released in May 2005 on Armageddon Music. Track 12 includes a hidden track.

Track listing 
All songs written by Sabina Classen and Michael Hankel.
"Angel Cry" – 3:41
"End of Time" – 3:48
"Symbol of Spirit" – 3:41
"Examination" – 4:15
"I Will" – 3:41
"Space Clearing" – 4:34
"Sacred Crystals" – 3:48
"Lost Inside" – 3:44
"Death Bells II" – 3:44
"Rebirthing" – 2:35
"Seasons in the Twilight" – 3:57
"Say Goodbye" – 24:36
"Im Wagen vor Mir" [Hidden Track] 3:07

Credits 
 Sabina Classen – vocals
 Franky Brotz – guitar
 Michael Hankel – guitar
 Alex DeBlanco – bass
 Julien Schmidt – drums
 Tom Angelripper – vocals on track 13

References

External links 
 Official Holy Moses discography
 

2005 albums
Holy Moses albums